Alfredo Rizzo (1 July 1933 – 7 February 2023) was an Italian middle-distance runner who competed at the 1960 Summer Olympics.

Nicknamed "King", Rizzo was the first Italian to go under 9' in the 3000 metres steeplechase. During his career he set up 14 national records and competed 37 times in the national team. After his retirement, he served as a trainer, manager and master of ceremonies in the Milan team Riccardi.

References

External links
 

1933 births
2023 deaths
Athletes (track and field) at the 1960 Summer Olympics
Italian male middle-distance runners
Italian male steeplechase runners
Olympic athletes of Italy
Athletes from Milan